Maksim Yevhenovych Levin (7 July 1981 – ) was a Ukrainian photographer. He reported as a photojournalist from 2006, for LB.ua and Reuters among many others. He also provided photographs for international humanitarian organisations including UNICEF and World Health Organization. 

During a mission to document the 2022 Russian invasion of Ukraine in Kyiv Oblast, Levin was detained, interrogated, possibly tortured, and executed by Russian soldiers. His friend, Oleksiy Chernyshov, who was accompanying him, was likely burned alive.

Life and career 
Levin was born on 7 July 1981 in Boyarka, Kyiv Oblast. He wanted to become a photographer already as a teenager, and attended a photography club while a school student. He first trained to be a computer systems engineer, as his father wished. He graduated from the Igor Sikorsky Kyiv Polytechnic Institute, and worked as a systems engineer.

Levin began working as a photojournalist in 2006. He was a staff photographer for LB.ua and a stringer for Reuters. He also worked for Associated Press, BBC, Hromadske and TRT World. His photographs were published by Elle, Korrespondent.net, Radio Bulgaria, Radio Free Europe/Radio Liberty, The Moscow Times, The Wall Street Journal, Time, Ukraine Crisis Media Center, Vatican News, and World News Media, among others. He also took photographs and conducted video projects for humanitarian organisations, including HealthRight International, UNFPA, the Organization for Security and Co-operation in Europe (OSCE), UNICEF, United Nations (UN), UN Women, and World Health Organization (WHO).

He was present for a number of battles in the 2014 Russo-Ukrainian War, and was surrounded by Russian forces during the Battle of Ilovaisk. He escaped alive, and was honoured in 2015 by President Petro Poroshenko with the Order "For Merits" of the III degree.

During the 2022 Russian invasion of Ukraine, Levin was quoted saying: "Every Ukrainian photographer dreams of taking a photo that will stop the war." One of his photographs, showing destroyed buildings in Kyiv, graced the cover of a March 2022 edition of the German magazine Der Spiegel. 

Levin and his wife had four sons.

Death 
Levin went missing on 13 March 2022, when he left, together with Oleksiy Chernyshov, to photograph consequences of Russian aggression near Huta-Mezhyhirska in the Kyiv Oblast. Connection to them was interrupted that day. His body was found near the village on 1 April 2022. According to the Ukrainian Prosecutor General's Office, he was fatally shot twice by Russian servicemen while unarmed and wearing a press jacket. According to a report published by Reporters Without Borders, he was executed by Russian soldiers, possibly after being interrogated and tortured. Levin's friend who was with him at the time, Oleksiy Chernyshov, was likely burned alive by Russian soldiers.

Levin was posthumously awarded the Order for Courage.

A funeral service was held in Kyiv's St. Michael's Cathedral. The head of the Orthodox Church of Ukraine, Metropolitan Epiphaniy, said that he was "one of the best photographers of modern Ukraine", who "served the truth". The funeral was at the new cemetery in Boyarka.

Exhibitions 
Levin's exhibitions include:
 Maydan: Human Factor
 Ukraine 24. War&Peace, Los Angeles
 Conflict Zone: Ukraine, Chicago
 Donbas War and Peace, European Parliament, Brussels
 Donbas: War and Peace, Prague
 Photo exhibition about the Battle of Ilovaisk, Kyiv

See also 
 List of journalists killed during the Russo-Ukrainian War
 List of solved missing person cases

References

Further reading 
 
 Ukrainian photographer and  Reuters contributor, Maksim Levin, killed covering war (photographs) Reuters, 4 April 2022

External links 
 

1981 births
2020s missing person cases
2022 deaths
21st-century Ukrainian journalists
Assassinated Ukrainian journalists
Deaths by firearm in Ukraine
Civilians killed in the Russian invasion of Ukraine
Formerly missing people
Journalists killed while covering the 2022 Russian invasion of Ukraine
Missing person cases in Ukraine
Kyiv Polytechnic Institute alumni
People from Boyarka
Recipients of the Order of Merit (Ukraine), 3rd class